Kirill Trofimovich Mazurov (25 March 1914, Rudnia-Pribytkovskaya, Mogilev Governorate – 19 December 1989) was a Soviet partisan, politician, and one of the leaders of the Belarusian resistance during World War II who governed the Byelorussian Soviet Socialist Republic as First Secretary of the Communist Party of Byelorussia from 1956 until 1965, when he became a member of the Politburo of the CPSU.

Political career
Kirill Mazurov was born in 1914 in the Mogilev Governorate of the Russian Empire in a peasant family of Belarusian ethnicity. He was originally a construction technician, and graduated from the Gomel highway technical school in 1933. He joined the Communist Party of the Soviet Union in 1940 and the Red Army in 1941. During the Great Patriotic War, he participated in military actions as a political instructor, a battalion commander and an instructor of the army's political department.

Mazurov left the army in 1942 to become secretary of the central committee of the Belarusian Komsomol. Mazurov then moved to a Soviet partisan unit where he became president of the central staff.

After the war, Mazurov returned to his position as secretary of the Belarusian Komsomol. In 1947 he joined the apparatus of the Communist Party of Byelorussia. From 1949 to 1950 he was the First Secretary of the Minsk city committee and from 1950 to 1953 first secretary of the Minsk regional committee of the Communist Party of Byelorussia. From 1950 to 1979, he was a deputy of the Supreme Soviet of the Soviet Union. After Joseph Stalin's death, he actively supported Nikita Khrushchev. He was chairman of the council of ministers of BSSR (1953–1965), then First Secretary of the Communist Party of Byelorussia (1956–1965). In 1964 he was appointed candidate member of the Politburo of the CPSU Central Committee and was then a full member from 26 March 1965 to 27 November 1978. He was also the First Deputy Chairman of the Council of Ministers (1965–1976).

Mazurov retired in 1978.

In the 1980s, he gave an interview to Izvestia in which he said he was the envoy of Brezhnev who commanded the Warsaw Pact invasion force in Czechoslovakia in 1968 under the code name "General Trofymov". He said he regretted his action, added "today I would not accept to guide one similar operation" and asked the Czechs to forgive the Soviets.

Decorations
He was awarded the Order of Lenin five times, the Order of the Red Banner, the Order of the Patriotic War 1st class and was a Hero of Socialist Labor in 1971. He received other military medals as well.

Further reading
Залесский К.А. Империя Сталина. Биографический энциклопедический словарь. Москва, Вече, 2000 (Zalesskiy K.A. Stalin's Empire. Biographical encyclopaedic dictionary. Moscow, Meeting, 2000)
Soviet military encyclopedia in 8 volumes, Vol. 5

External links
  Biography of Mazurov
  Mazurov biography
  Biography of Mazurov

References

1914 births
1989 deaths
Burials at Novodevichy Cemetery
People from Gomel District
People from Gomelsky Uyezd
Politburo of the Central Committee of the Communist Party of the Soviet Union members
Presidium of the Supreme Soviet
Third convocation members of the Soviet of the Union
Fourth convocation members of the Soviet of the Union
Fifth convocation members of the Soviet of the Union
Sixth convocation members of the Soviet of the Union
Seventh convocation members of the Soviet of the Union
Eighth convocation members of the Soviet of the Union
Ninth convocation members of the Soviet of the Union
Members of the Congress of People's Deputies of the Soviet Union
Heads of the Communist Party of Byelorussia
Heads of government of the Byelorussian Soviet Socialist Republic
Members of the Supreme Soviet of the Russian Soviet Federative Socialist Republic
Soviet military personnel of World War II
Belarusian partisans
Heroes of Socialist Labour
Recipients of the Order of Lenin
Recipients of the Order of the Red Banner
Recipients of the Order of Friendship of Peoples